Sunder Deodhar (married name Sunder Patwardhan) is a female badminton player from India. She is the daughter of India's cricket player D. B. Deodhar.

Career
Sunder Deodhar won her first national title in 1942 in the women's doubles with her sister Tara Deodhar.  Between 1942 and 1954 the Deodhar sisters, Suman, Sunder, and Tara, dominated the Indian National Badminton Championships.

References

Indian female badminton players
Indian national badminton champions
Living people
Sportswomen from Maharashtra
Marathi people
20th-century Indian women
20th-century Indian people
Year of birth missing (living people)
Racket sportspeople from Maharashtra